The 1955 U.S. Women's Open was the tenth U.S. Women's Open, held from June 30 to July 2 at Wichita Country Club in Wichita, Kansas. It was the third conducted by the United States Golf Association (USGA).

Fay Crocker led wire-to-wire and won the first of her two major championships, four strokes ahead of runners-up Mary Lena Faulk and Louise Suggs. From Uruguay, Crocker was the first international winner of the U.S. Women's Open. A 79 (+7) in the wind in the third round on Saturday morning reduced it to a single stroke over Faulk, with Suggs another two strokes back.

Defending champion Babe Zaharias did not compete due to back surgery; she also missed the 1953 edition due to colon cancer surgery and died in 1956.

This was the second U.S. Women's Open played in Wichita; the first in 1950 was at Rolling Hills Country Club.

Past champions in the field

Final leaderboard
Saturday, July 2, 1955

Source:

References

External links
USGA final leaderboard
U.S. Women's Open Golf Championship
U.S. Women's Open – past champions – 1955
Wichita Country Club

U.S. Women's Open
Golf in Kansas
Sports competitions in Wichita, Kansas
Women's sports in Kansas
U.S. Women's Open
U.S. Women's Open
U.S. Women's Open
U.S. Women's Open
U.S. Women's Open